HMCS Chignecto (hull number MCB 156) was a  that served in the Royal Canadian Navy during the Cold War. The ship entered service in 1953 and in 1954, was transferred to the French Navy and renamed La Bayonnaise. Serving as a minesweeper until 1973, the ship became a territorial patrol ship and remained in service until 1976. La Bayonnaise was broken up for scrap in 1977.

Design and description
The Bay class were designed and ordered as replacements for the Second World War-era minesweepers that the Royal Canadian Navy operated at the time. They had a complement of 38 officers and ratings.

The Bay-class minesweepers were powered by two GM 12-cylinder diesel engines driving two shafts creating . The ships were armed with one 40 mm Bofors gun and were equipped with minesweeping gear.

Operational history
The ship's keel was laid down on 4 June 1951 by Marine Industries at their yard in Sorel, Quebec. Named for a bay located between Nova Scotia and New Brunswick, Chignecto was launched on 13 June 1953. The ship was commissioned on 1 December 1953.

Chignecto served with the Royal Canadian Navy for three months before being paid off on 31 March 1954. Transferred the same day to the French Navy, the ship was renamed La Bayonnaise and given the hull number P 654. She served as a minesweeper until 1973 when the minesweeping gear was removed and she transferred to the Pacific for duty as an overseas territories patrol vessel. The vessel was discarded in 1976 and broken up for scrap at Papeete, Tahiti.

References

Notes

Citations

References
 
 
 
 
 

 

Bay-class minesweepers
Bay-class minesweepers of the French Navy
Ships built in Quebec
1952 ships
Cold War minesweepers of Canada
Cold War minesweepers of France
Minesweepers of the Royal Canadian Navy